Gournay-en-Bray is a commune in the Seine-Maritime department in the Normandy region in north-western France.

Geography
The commune's territory includes three former parish hamlets, near the confluence of the Epte with three other smaller rivers – the Morette, Auchy and Aulnaie.

Population

Heraldry

Places of interest

 The Collegiate Church of Saint-Hildevert, built in the 12th century, is famous for its Romanesque capitals, ornate decoration and its ancient religious sculptures.
 Vestiges of a 17th-century priory, now a farm
 Ruins of a 12th-century Capuchin monastery
 The chapel at the hamlet of Saint-Clair, built in 1829
 A memorial fountain of the 18th century
 The town gates and fortifications, dating from the 13th century
 Traces of 10th-century fortifications
 The 16th-century church of Saint-Jean-Batiste

International relations
Hailsham, England
 
Gournay-en-Bray is twinned with Hailsham in the English County of East Sussex.  Hailsham has a much larger population (circa 20,500 compared to Gournay-en-Bray's circa 6,500) but, according to Hailsham Town Council, "the features and facilities of both towns are quite similar".  A twinning charter was signed in Hailsham in October 2000 and in Gournay-en-Bray in February 2001, and renewed in both towns on its 10th anniversary.

See also
Communes of the Seine-Maritime department

References

External links

 Gournay-en-Bray official website 
 Office of tourism in Gournay-en-Bray  

Communes of Seine-Maritime